Henry Foley may refer to:

Cricketers
Henry Foley (English cricketer) (1905–1959), left-hand bat for Worcestershire
Henry Foley (New Zealand cricketer) (1906–1948), left-hand bat for Wellington

Others
Henry Foley (historian) (1811–1891), English Jesuit church historian
Henry Foley, 5th Baron Foley (1850–1905), British peer
Henry Foley (1917–1985), English man killed in police custody (Death of Henry Foley)
Henry M. Foley (1918–1982), American experimental physicist

See also
Henry Foley Knight (1918–1982), British administrator; Governor of Madras in 1946